The 2007–08 Coppin State Eagles men's basketball team represented Coppin State University during the 2007–08 NCAA Division I men's basketball season. The Eagles, led by 22nd year head coach Fang Mitchell, played their home games at the Coppin Center and were members of the Mid-Eastern Athletic Conference. Despite losing 19 of their first 23 games and starting 0–8 in MEAC play, Coppin State finished the season 16–21 (7–9 MEAC). The Eagles went on an unexpected run to win the MEAC tournament title to receive an automatic bid to the NCAA tournament as one of two No. 16 seeds in the East region. In the Play-in Game, Coppin State lost to Mount St. Mary's, 69–60.

Roster

Schedule and results

|-
!colspan=9 style=| Regular season

|-
!colspan=9 style=| MEAC tournament

|-
!colspan=9 style=| NCAA tournament

References

2007-08
2007–08 Mid-Eastern Athletic Conference men's basketball season
2008 NCAA Division I men's basketball tournament participants
2007 in sports in Maryland
2008 in sports in Maryland